Sphingobacterium populi is a Gram-negative, aerobic and non-motile  bacterium from the genus of Sphingobacterium which has been isolated from the bark of the tree Populus × euramericana.

References

External links
Type strain of Sphingobacterium populi at BacDive -  the Bacterial Diversity Metadatabase

 

Sphingobacteriia
Bacteria described in 2016